O Battery (The Rocket Troop) Royal Horse Artillery is the Headquarters Battery of the British Army's 1st Regiment Royal Horse Artillery. It is currently based in Purvis Lines in Larkhill Garrison.

History

Formation
The battery was formed on 1 January 1813. In that year the battery fought as the only British Army unit present at the Battle of Leipzig as 'The Rocket Brigade' under Captain Richard Bogue. It was attached to the bodyguard of Bernadotte, Crown Prince of Sweden. During the battle Bogue was killed in action after a successful attack on five French and Saxon battalions at Paunsdorf, and Lieutenant Fox-Strangways assumed command. In 1815, the battery fought with some of its rockets at the Battle of Waterloo, under Captain Edward Charles Whinyates. It served in the Crimean War, Second Anglo-Afghan War and the Second Boer War.

World War I
During World War I the battery supported the charge by the Royal Horse Guards at Villeselve in March 1918.

World War II
During World War II the battery served with 6th Regiment, Royal Horse Artillery.

Post war
The battery transferred to 2nd Regiment, Royal Horse Artillery in 1951 which re-roled to become 2nd Field Regiment Royal Artillery in 1958. In the 1970s, the battery completed tours in Northern Ireland. In 1993 it transferred to 1st Regiment Royal Horse Artillery and, in 1996, the battery was deployed to Bosnia. In 2004, B Battery deployed with 1 RHA to Basra in Iraq on Operation Telic 4 and in 2007 the battery deployed with 1st Regiment Royal Horse Artillery to Basra in Iraq on Operation Telic 10.

See also

British Army
Royal Artillery
Royal Horse Artillery
List of Royal Artillery Batteries

References

Bibliography

External links
 

Royal Horse Artillery batteries
Royal Artillery batteries
British military units and formations of the Crimean War
1813 establishments in the United Kingdom
Military units and formations established in 1813
British military units and formations of the Napoleonic Wars